Dr. G. Bakthavathsalam is the chairman and the managing trustee of Dharmaveera K Govindaswamy Naidu Medical Trust, which runs the K.G. Hospital in Coimbatore, India.  He was awarded a Padma Shri in 2005. Dr GB, as he is fondly known as, was born on 5 April 1942 at Annur village of Coimbatore district and graduated with a Masters of Science (MBBS - 1964) from Madras Medical College. He then received his post graduate training in surgery at the Mount Sinai Hospital in Chicago (USA).

KG Hospital
On the clarion call given by his father, Dharmaveera K. Govindaswamy, to serve the poor countrymen in the field of healthcare, Bakthavathsalam returned to India in 1973. In 1974, his father, Dharmaveera K Govindaswamy Naidu set up KG Hospital. 

Initially, started as 10-beds and 1 doctor hospital, KG Hospital has now grown into a 550-bedded multi and super speciality and post graduate medical center — a "Centre of Excellence" recognized in India and abroad and has treated more than 70 lakh patients under the blessings of his beloved father  Hospital is also a postgraduate teaching institute supported by Colleges of Allied Health Sciences, Nursing and Physiotherapy. Alumni from KG College of Health Sciences are present in 21 countries world wide.

Humanitarian efforts
He established the K.G. Eye Hospital, where 85,000 free cataract surgeries have been done for the poor. The eye surgeries were paid for by Lions club.Dr A.P.J Abdul Kalam, the former president of India, appreciated KG Hospital's efforts in his book India 2020.

Under Dr Bakthavathsalam's leadership, KG Hospital has performed 1600 free heart surgeries and 1,500 dialysis free of cost. Under KG Hospital's little hearts scheme, 500 heart operations have been performed on children and 35,000 children have been screened 
for heart diseases, free of cost.

Further, over 300,000 adults have been screen free of cost for blood pressure and 35,000 accident victims have been saved. KG Hospital routinely conducts rural medical camps - 14 lakh + people have been screened free through this initiative.

KG Hospital provided free treatment to 250 bomb blast victims at Coimbatore in 1998 and contributed substantially for the victims of the Kargil War, Gujarat earthquake, the kumbakonam fire tragedy, tsunami, and the recent Kerala floods.

Positions held
Bakthavathsalam has held numerous positions in his career in the healthcare sector and has chaired in the following positions: Prof. of Surgery, Govt. Royapettah Hospital, Madras, Registrar of Surgery, Coimbatore Medical College, (1969–73) |. Surgical Registrar - Altoona Hospital, Altoona, Pennsylvania, U.S.A, (1973) | Fellow in GI Endoscopy at Tokyo University, Japan (1984) | Consultant Surgeon - G. Kuppusamy Naidu Memorial Hospital, Coimbatore (1978) |  Recognized Guide for Ph.D. research students of Bharathiar University, Coimbatore, (since 1985) | Hon. Prof. of Surgery - PSG Institute of Medical Sciences & Research, Coimbatore (1988) 

He has served as president of: Uro Lithiasis Project Scheme (ICMR), Indian Medical Association (1986–87), Association of Surgeons of India — Coimbatore, Accident Care Association of Coimbatore, Coimbatore Hospitals' Association, Society of Gastrointestinal Endoscopy of India (1991)

Memberships
He has also been a member of national and regional committees in India, including the following.

Medical Council of India, New Delhi (1972–1990), Planning Board, Dr. M.G.R.Medical University, Chennai (1994), Planning Board, Bharathiar University, Coimbatore (1990), Syndicate, Bharathiar University, Coimbatore (1983–86), Senate, Bharathiyar University, Coimbatore (1990–93), Board of Governors — Indira Gandhi School of Management, Pondicherry University (1990), Executive Committee, Indian Chamber of Commerce & Industry, Coimbatore, Tamil Nadu State Telephone Advisory Committee

He currently holds management positions in various KG Group ventures, including KG Hospital, The Kannapiran Mills, The Kadri Mills, KG Healthcare, and KG Information Systems Private Limited.

Accolades
On 10 Nov 2009, he received the D.Sc. (honoris causa) from the MGR Medical University, Tamil Nadu, India. In 2005, he received the Padma Shri (for his work in medicine) from the then President of India A. P. J. Abdul Kalam. He received Dr. B. C. Roy Award in 1984 from Prime Minister Rajiv Gandhi, Seva Ratna Award in 1999 from the Centenarian Trust, Vaidya Ratna Award in 2001 from Sri Adichunchanagiri Maha Samsthana Math, Swamy Seva Puraskaram Award, Life Time Achievement Award from Salem Gastro Centre, "The Jewel of Coimbatore Award" in 2005 and an "Emeritus Teacher" Award from DNB National Board, Healthcare Icon/ Leader National 2021 by Economic Times.

Further reading
 The Hindu Business Line : Blending business with service The Hindu - 17 January 2004
 Dr G Bakthavathsalam awarded the D.Sc. (Honoris Causa) by MGR Medical University The Hindu - 10 November 2009
  KG Foundation honours six with `Personality of the Decade' award The Hindu - 5 November 2005
  `Medical education should focus on social needs' The Hindu - 21 August 2005

External links
  The Hindu - 16 March 2006
 ADDRESS LIST OF PADMA AWARDEES-2005 PADMA VIBHUSHAN (9) 1. Dr. Bal - Indian Government
 KG Hospital

Bakthavatsalam, G.
Living people
Recipients of the Padma Shri in medicine
Dr. B. C. Roy Award winners
1942 births
20th-century Indian medical doctors
Medical doctors from Tamil Nadu
People from Coimbatore district
20th-century surgeons